Byssoloma is a genus of leaf-dwelling lichens in the family Pilocarpaceae.

Species

, Species Fungorum accepts 34 species of Byssoloma.
Byssoloma annuum 
Byssoloma aurantiacum 
Byssoloma australiense 
Byssoloma braulioi 
Byssoloma brunneodiscum  – China
Byssoloma carneum 
Byssoloma catarinense 
Byssoloma catillariosporum 
Byssoloma chlorinum 
Byssoloma confusum 
Byssoloma diederichii 
Byssoloma dimerelloides 
Byssoloma discordans 
Byssoloma fuscothallinum 
Byssoloma fuscum 
Byssoloma humboldtianum 
Byssoloma hypophyllum 
Byssoloma kakouettae 
Byssoloma laurisilvae  – Europe
Byssoloma leucoblepharum 
Byssoloma llimonae 
Byssoloma maderense 
Byssoloma marginatum 
Byssoloma melanodiscocarpum  – China
Byssoloma microcarpum 
Byssoloma multipunctatum 
Byssoloma murinum 
Byssoloma permutans 
Byssoloma rubrofuscum  – China
Byssoloma rubromarginatum 
Byssoloma spinulosum 
Byssoloma sprucei 
Byssoloma subdiscordans 
Byssoloma subleucoblepharum 
Byssoloma subundulatum 
Byssoloma tricholomum 
Byssoloma vanderystii  – Africa
Byssoloma xanthonicum  – New Caledonia

References

Pilocarpaceae
Lichen genera
Lecanorales genera
Taxa described in 1853
Taxa named by Vittore Benedetto Antonio Trevisan de Saint-Léon